Lambert Hall, located at 1703 Heights Boulevard, Houston, Texas, United States, was built in 1927 as the first permanent sanctuary for Heights Christian Church, led by Pastor Clark W. Lambert, for whom the hall is named.

History
On July 31, 1927, the church held the ground-breaking ceremony and the cornerstone was laid.  Many Houston celebrities took part, including:  Mayor Oscar F. Holcombe; Dr. Edison E. Oberholtzer, Superintendent of Public Schools and founder/President of the University of Houston; and pastors from other local churches.  On October 23, 1927, the building was dedicated.  Present were architect C. N. Nelson and contractor P. H. Fredericks.  The building had been erected at a cost of $39,904.30, an amount that included the pews, art glass and lighting fixtures.

Heights Christian Church built its new sanctuary, next door to Lambert Hall, in 1967.  After that year, Lambert Hall became available for community events.  For several years Lambert Hall was home for the Heights Museum, now in the fire station on 11th Street.

Opera in the Heights
Opera in the Heights, a non-profit, professional regional opera company, held its first Gala Opera Evening, a Fledermaus Party, in Lambert Hall on April 12, 1996.  A few days later, an arsonist set fire to Lambert Hall, having poured flammables onto the piano and the backstage storage.  A neighbor, Marie Campos, saw the fire in the early morning, and called the fire department, which arrived in minutes and saved the building.

Opera in the Heights held its next performance, a Gala II Concert, on May 11, 1996, in Lambert Hall, with a curtain hanging over fire damaged wall.  Clean-up was financed by this benefit concert, a dinner party, and the sweat of church members, Opera in the Heights company members and neighbors.  The restoration was done by Opera in the Heights Board member Theo Bashshiti and his construction crews.

Since 1996, Opera in the Heights and Heights Christian Church have worked together to renovate Lambert Hall. By fall of 2004, Lambert Hall was renewed and beautified with new floor surfaces, a rebuilt air conditioner, new seats – and restoring the beautiful stained glass windows.  New lighting and sound equipment were installed in 2005.  Grants from Houston Endowment Inc. have been instrumental in making Lambert Hall the architectural gem it is today.

Opera in the Heights provides professional opportunities for opera's rising stars, allowing them the coveted opportunity to sing a leading role under the direction of a talented maestro and director.

Mission: Opera in the Heights, a regional, professional company, exists to provide a stage for emerging opera performers and to bring affordable opera to the Greater Houston Area.

UpStage Theatre
Upstage Theatre was a performing arts tenant at Lambert Hall from December 2005 until August 2015.

In December 2005 UpStage Theatre produced its first show at Lambert Hall with the original holiday musical, Santa's Magic Timepiece. Thus dawned a new era for UpStage and Lambert Hall, welcoming this family-friendly theatre company to the beautiful venue. UpStage, founded in 2000, launched a full season of Evening and Young Audience Series productions in 2006 and adopted Lambert Hall as its new home.

UpStage produced wonderful classics such as The Sunshine Boys, Plaza Suite, The Odd Couple; musical delights such as Buddy, The Buddy Holly Story and Back to the 80's; and fabulous entertainment for the young and young-at-heart with Cinderella, Hans Christian Andersen, and Too Many Beagles!.

See also

Houston Heights, Houston, Texas

References

External links
Opera in the Heights
UpStage Theatre

Buildings and structures in Houston
History of Houston
Buildings and structures completed in 1927
Theatres in Houston
Music venues in Houston